Manfred Niekisch (* 14 July 1951 in Nuremberg, Germany) is a German biologist, expert in international nature conservation, former director of Frankfurt Zoo (2008-2017) and president of the Society for Tropical Ecology.

Life
Manfred Niekisch studied biology at the University of Cologne/DE and obtained his PhD (Dr. rer. nat.) at the University of Bonn/DE with a study on the dispersal strategies of the yellow-bellied toad. From 1983 to 1989 he was director for species conservation of World Wildlife Fund Germany and the Wildlife Trade Monitoring Network TRAFFIC. Between 1989 and 1998 he was executive director of OroVerde, Foundation for tropical forests. In 1998 he became Professor for International Nature Conservation at the University of Greifswald/DE - the only professorship of that kind in the German-speaking world. In March 2008, he took over as director of Frankfurt Zoo, which he is developing into an international nature conservation centre. At the Universities of Marburg/DE and Hanoi/Vietnam and the Universidad Internacional de Andalucía in Baeza/ES, he is lecturing on international nature conservation. In 2010 he furthermore received the nomination as professor for international nature conservation at Goethe-University Frankfurt. His scientific work lies particularly in both strategies and instruments for the sustainable use of natural resources, aiming especially at the conservation of biological diversity; furthermore, he is working on international conventions with relevance to nature conservation. Niekisch is the author of numerous publications and co-editor of the Journal for Nature Conservation. He has working experience in many countries, with a focus on Vietnam and the countries of Latin America.

Honorary functions
Manfred Niekisch is active in many honorary functions, among others as President of the Society for Tropical Ecology (gtö), vice-president of the Frankfurt Zoological Society (FZS), vice-president of the “Help for the Threatened Wildlife Foundation”, Chairman of the foundation OroVerde, and as chairman of the board of trustees of the Bruno-H.-Schubert foundation.

Publications (selection)
 2010: International conservation policy and the contribution of the zoo and aquarium community. – In: DICK, G. & M. GUSSET (Ed.): Building a Future for Wildlife. Zoos and Aquariums Committed to Biodiversity Conservation. S. 45–48, Gland
 2008: Vorwort. – In: WWF Artenschutz. Die bedrohten Tiere der Erde. – White Star Verlag, Wiesbaden
 2008: Aspirations and realities of the Biodiversity Convention. – Rural 21 The International Journal for Rural Development, Vol. 42 no. 2, S. 8–10. Frankfurt
 2006: Countdown 2010. Schutz der  biologischen Vielfalt. – Grünbuch Europa, Politische Ökologie 102–103, S. 49-52
 2006: Marketing concepts for global conservation. – World Association of Zoos and Aquariums (Ed.): Proceedings of the 5th International Conference on Zoo Marketing and Public Relations, S. 34–36. Bern
 2006: IUCN´s Countdown 2010 Initiative. – World Association of Zoos and Aquariums (Ed.): Proceedings of the 5th International Conference on Zoo Marketing and Public Relations, S. 19–20. Bern
 2002: CITES-Artenschutzkonferenz: Perspektiven für die Zukunft. - EU-Rundschreiben, Ausgabe 11/12.02, Dezember 2002, S. 10 - 12

External links
 Publications of Manfred Niekisch

1951 births
Living people
German ecologists